Loveridgea is a genus of amphisbaenians in the family Amphisbaenidae. Species in the genus are commonly known as worm lizards, even though they are not lizards. Two species are placed in this genus.

Etymology
The generic name, Loveridgea, is in honor of British herpetologist Arthur Loveridge.

The specific name, ionidesii, is in honor of British game warden Constantine John Philip Ionides (1901–1968), who was known as the "Snake Man of British East Africa".

Species
Loveridgea ionidesii (Battersby, 1950) - Liwale round-snouted worm lizard
Loveridgea phylofiniens (Tornier, 1899) - Udjiji worm lizard

Nota bene: A binomial authority in parentheses indicates that the species was originally described in a genus other than Loveridgea.

References

Further reading

Battersby JC (1950). "A new amphisbaenid lizard from Tanganyika territory and notes on the rare snake Chilorhinophis ". Ann. Mag. Nat. Hist., Twelfth Series 3: 413-417. (Amphisbaena ionidesii, new species).
Gans C (2005). "Checklist and Bibliography of the Amphisbaenia of the World". Bull. American Mus. Nat. Hist. (289): 1-130.
Tornier G (1899). "Drei Reptilien aus Afrika ". Zoologischer Anzeiger 22 (588): 258-261. (Amphisbaena phylofiniens, new species, pp. 260–261). (in German).

 
Amphisbaenidae
Lizard genera
Taxa named by Paulo Vanzolini